Cabinet of Katrín Jakobsdóttir may refer to:
 First cabinet of Katrín Jakobsdóttir
 Second cabinet of Katrín Jakobsdóttir